Nikki Adler (born Nikolina Orlović; April 2, 1987) is a Croatian-German professional boxer. She held the WBC female super-middleweight title from 2013 to 2017.

Amateur career

At the age of 15, Nikki Adler, then still Nikolina Orlović, started kickboxing. There she quickly showed her great talent, so that she could successfully fight her first fight after only a few weeks. This was followed by two third places at the German Championships and the Bavarian Championships. At the same time, she took part in the German boxing championship in 2004, which she was able to decide immediately.

Nikki Adler then completed an education at Deutsche Post AG alongside her amateur career.

In 2007, the left-back took the boxing training again and, after a short training period, again took part in the German Championships, which she was able to win. For Croatia, from then on, she has been an international player since she was not a German national. Under the former Ukrainian national Borys Raytman she developed steadily further. She regularly took part in German, European and World Championships.

After receiving the German nationality, she was suspended by the AIBA for 3 years, which prevented a start in the German national team and finally led her to decide for a career with the pros.

Amateur boxing record: 30 fights, 24 wins, 1 draw

Amateurs:  World Championships 2008 (5th place), European Union Championship 2008 (3rd place), International German Champion (2004,2007,2008,2009,2010), Croatian Champion 2008

In the final of the German championship 2008, she defeated future middleweight boxing  world champion, Christina Hammer.

Professional career

In 2010, Adler became a professional at the Wiking Box Team in Berlin. Under coach Hartmut Schröder, she became German champion in May 2011 by a knockout victory in the second round against Danijela Bickei and already in November of the same year, the European champion of the WIBF by a point victory after 10 rounds against the Karlsruherin Pia Porter.

In 2012 the cooperation with Wiking ended. She then coached the coaches team Thommy Wiedemann and Bernd Fernengel in Ulm until 2014.

In January 2013, she became WIBA world champion by a unanimous point win against Edita Karabeg. In May 2013, with a victory over Zane Brige from Latvia, the second World Championship title followed, this time after the WBF version. The fight took place in Volgodonsk, Russia. She won the WBC title in November 2013 in a fight against Zane Brige over 10 rounds after unanimous decision in Grozny. It was the first women's boxing match in Chechnya.

In May 2014, Nikki Adler defended her WIBA title in Krasnodar, Russia against Gifty Amanua Ankrah. In September 2014, Adler again celebrated a victory in Holzminden by K.O. against Rita Kenessey.

In 2015 Adler focused on the defense of her WBC title in a gripping battle against Szilvia Szabados in the MHP Arena Ludwigsburg. Adler won by a unanimous decision. Her next challenger was Elene Sikmashvili. Adler defeated the Georgian in Saarbrücken in July 2016 by knockout and remains the reigning and undefeated world champion in the super middleweight division. On August 4, 2017 Adler was defeated by Claressa Shields and lost her WBC title.

Professional boxing record

References

External links 
Official site
 

1987 births
Living people
Sportspeople from Augsburg
German women boxers
Croatian women boxers
Croatian emigrants to Germany
German people of Croatian descent
Middleweight boxers
World boxing champions
World super-middleweight boxing champions
World Boxing Council champions